Wen Chia-ling (born 14 January 1978) is a Taiwanese archer. She competed in the women's individual and team events at the 2000 Summer Olympics.

References

1978 births
Living people
Taiwanese female archers
Olympic archers of Taiwan
Archers at the 2000 Summer Olympics
Place of birth missing (living people)